George Bassett & Co., known simply as Bassett's, was a British confectionery company and is now used as a brand of Cadbury, owned by Mondelēz International. The company was founded in Sheffield by George Bassett in 1842. Perhaps the company's best-known sweets, the Liquorice Allsorts, were created by accident in 1899 and in 1926 the mascot of Bassett's, Bertie Bassett, was created; Bertie continues to represent the brand today. Jelly Babies have been produced by the brand since 1918. In 2016, the brand was joined with Maynards to create Maynards Bassetts.

History

The Sheffield Directory of 1842 records George Bassett as being "wholesale confectioner, lozenge maker and British wine trader". In 1851, Bassett took on an apprentice called Samuel Meggitt Johnson, who later became Bassett's son-in-law. His descendants ran the company until Gordon Johnson retired as chairman in the 1970s. Bassett's was first listed on the London Stock Exchange in 1929. They opened up a factory in Broad Street, Sheffield in 1852. The site moved in 1933 to Owlerton in another district of the city and remains there today. Unclaimed Babies were being produced during the 19th century, especially in the North West of England. In 1918, Bassetts launched their own range of the soft sweets which they called Peace Babies. They were re-launched as Jelly Babies in the 1950s and were allegedly thrown at the Beatles during concerts as they were a favourite of George Harrison.

The Liquorice Allsorts variety was created by accident when Bassett salesman Charlie Thompson dropped the samples of several different products in front of a prospective client. The client was taken by the idea of selling the sweets all mixed up and in return for the success, the company allowed the client to name the new brand.

Barratt & Co. Ltd. was acquired in a friendly takeover by Bassett's in 1966. In 1989, the combined firms were acquired by the then-united Cadbury-Schweppes company in a deal brokered for £91 million. In 2016, all the products were re-marketed under the Maynards Bassett dual branding.

Products
Confectionery items that use the Bassett's name today include:

 Liquorice Allsorts
 Fruit Allsorts
 Dessert Allsorts
 Sports Mixture
 Jelly Babies
 Milky Babies
 Fruity Babies
 Party Babies
 Sherbet Lemons
 Fruit Bonbons
 Lemon Bonbons
 Pear Drops
 Dolly mixture
 Sweetshop Favourites
 Murray Mints
 Mint Creams
 Mint Favourites
 Traditional Wine Gums (discontinued)
 Traditional Wine Gums (New recipe...)
 Imperials
 Imperials Spearmint
 Everton Mints
 Animal Mix
 Snakes
 Sour Squirms
 and assorted toffees

References

Bibliography

External links

Food and drink companies established in 1842
Cadbury brands
Mondelez International brands
Confectionery companies of the United Kingdom
Defunct food manufacturers of the United Kingdom
Manufacturing companies based in Sheffield
Defunct companies based in Sheffield
1842 establishments in England
Yorkshire cuisine